Moner Phool (Assamese: মনৰ ফুল) is a 2016 Indian Koch Rajbongshi language drama children's video film, written and directed by Robin Chandra Roy. Under banner of R C R production. The film stars Suman, Tikli, Bishal and Jublee.

Cast
 Suman Roy as Suman
 Tikli Roy as Suman's sister
 Jublee Roy as Suman's sister
 Bishal Roy as Student

References

External links

2016 short films
Indian short films
Films set in Assam